Dichordophora phoenix, the phoenix emerald, is a species of emerald moth in the family Geometridae. It is found in North America.

The MONA or Hodges number for Dichordophora phoenix is 7057.

References

Further reading

 

Geometrinae
Articles created by Qbugbot
Moths described in 1912